Insatiable is an American dark comedy-drama television series created by Lauren Gussis, starring Dallas Roberts and Debby Ryan. It is based on Jeff Chu's article "The Pageant King of Alabama", published in July 2014 in The New York Times Magazine. The first season premiered on Netflix on August 10, 2018. In September 2018, the series was renewed for a second season, which premiered on October 11, 2019. On February 17, 2020, Netflix cancelled the series after two seasons.

The series received mixed reviews with most of the negative reviews coming from critics, who called the show "offensive" and "insulting", while the positive reviews from audiences, who praised the performances (especially Ryan, Roberts, and Alyssa Milano) and dark humor.

Plot
17-year-old Patty Bladell was bullied at school for being overweight, but after a violent encounter with a homeless man and a summer of liquid diet, she becomes thin and determined to exact revenge on her bullies at the start of her senior year. Bob Armstrong, a disgraced civil lawyer and beauty pageant coach, discovers Patty's potential and sets out to convert her into a beauty queen.

Cast and characters

Main
 Debby Ryan as Patty Bladell
 Dallas Roberts as Bob Armstrong Jr.
 Christopher Gorham as Bob Barnard
 Sarah Colonna as Angie Bladell
 Erinn Westbrook as Magnolia Barnard
 Kimmy Shields as Nonnie Thompson
 Michael Provost as Brick Armstrong
 Irene Choi as Dixie Sinclair
 Alyssa Milano as Coralee Huggins-Armstrong
 Arden Myrin as Regina Sinclair (season 2; recurring season 1)

Recurring
 Brett Rice as Robert Armstrong Sr.
 Daniel Kang as Donald Choi
 Jordan Gelber as Sheriff Hank Thompson (season 1)
 James Lastovic as Christian Keene (season 1; guest season 2)
 Chloe Bridges as Roxy Buckley (season 1; guest season 2)
 Beverly D'Angelo as Stella Rose Buckley (season 1; guest season 2)
 Michael Ian Black as Pastor Mike Keene (season 1; guest season 2)
 Ashley D. Kelley as Dee Marshall
 Caroline Pluta as Heather Kristina Pamela Kendall Jackson Johnson (season 2)
 Vincent Rodriguez III as Detective Rudy Cruz (season 2)
 Alex Landi as Henry Lee (season 2)

Guest
 Carly Hughes as Etta Mae Barnard (season 1)
 Robin Tunney as Brandylynn Huggens (season 1)
 Christine Taylor as Gail Keene (season 1)
 Jon Lovitz as Father Schwartz (season 1)
 William Baldwin (season 1) / Dana Ashbrook (season 2) as Gordy Greer
 Gloria Diaz as Gloria Reyes (season 2)
 Tommy Dorfman as Jonathan (season 2)
 Lucius Baston as Warden Winters (season 2)
 Lance Bass as Brazen Moorehead (season 2)

Episodes

Season 1 (2018)

Season 2 (2019)

Production
A pilot for the series was ordered by The CW, but passed on before Netflix picked up the series. The series was filmed in Newnan, Georgia and Atlanta, Georgia .  Season 2 was filmed from early-March 2019 to late-June 2019. Season 2 only consisted of 10 episodes, compared to 12 episodes in the first season. On February 14, 2020, the series was cancelled after two seasons.

Release
On July 19, 2018, the trailer for the series was released. The first season of Insatiable premiered on Netflix on August 10, 2018.

On July 10, 2018, Netflix released the first teaser and the first images from the series.

Prior to the show's release, The Guardian reported on July 24, 2018, that over 100,000 people had signed an online petition on Change.org started on July 20, 2018, calling for Netflix to cancel Insatiable, accusing it of "fat shaming". Lauren Gussis, the show's creator, defended the show, saying it was based on her own experiences as a teenager. Alyssa Milano stated on Twitter, "We are not shaming Patty .. We are addressing (through comedy) the damage that occurs from fat-shaming." As of August 27, 2018, the petition had over 230,000 signatures.

Reception

The series has an approval rating of 11% based on 56 reviews from critics, with an average rating of 2.68/10 on Rotten Tomatoes. The site's critic consensus reads: "Broad stereotypes, clumsy social commentary, and a failed attempt at wokeness make Insatiable hard to swallow." Metacritic reported a score of 25 out of 100 for the series, based on reviews from 15 critics, indicating "generally unfavorable" reviews.

In negative reviews, Tim Goodman of The Hollywood Reporter called the series "trite", "unfunny", and "a hot bloated mess", while Jen Chaney from Vulture called it "an equal opportunity trainwreck" replete with bad jokes about rape and pedophilia, and offensive stereotypes of African-Americans, Christians, Southerners and gay people.

Reviewer Linda Holmes of NPR said the show willfully misunderstood the realities of fat-shaming and the concerns of fat people like herself; arguing that being fat should be respected and treated with kindness: "Let me assure you: It is not satire. Insatiable is satire in the same way someone who screams profanities out a car window is a spoken-word poet."

Writer Roxane Gay called the show "lazy" and "insulting" in a Refinery29 piece, saying "Insatiable's greatest sin is that it suffers from a profound lack of imagination. The show cannot imagine that a straight man could truly love pageants and mentoring young women and be secure in his masculinity, or that a young lesbian could love herself enough to not fall in love with her straight best friend, or that a fat girl could be happy, healthy, and thriving without losing weight. Never does this show dare to imagine that maybe it was everyone else who had the problem when Patty was fat, not Patty herself. The show cannot imagine that perhaps, the most profound way Patty could seek vengeance would be to love herself at any size, to be seen by a love interest as lovable at any size, to see herself as beautiful because of, rather than despite, her fat body."

In an interview with Variety, star Debby Ryan stated that she listened to the body-positive podcast "She's All Fat" in preparation for the role. Responding via their Twitter account, hosts of the podcast Sophia Carter-Kahn and April K. Quioh stated: "We're not sure how our show could inspire a thin actress to don a fat suit as we've discussed at length how this very act is incredibly harmful to the fat community."

References

External links
 
 

2010s American black comedy television series
2010s American comedy-drama television series
2010s American high school television series
2010s American LGBT-related comedy television series
2010s American LGBT-related drama television series
2010s American teen drama television series
2018 American television series debuts
2019 American television series endings
Body image in popular culture
English-language Netflix original programming
Television controversies in the United States
Television shows about eating disorders
Television series about beauty pageants
Television series about bullying
Television series about teenagers
Television series by CBS Studios
Television series by Ryan Seacrest Productions
Television shows filmed in Georgia (U.S. state)
Television shows set in Georgia (U.S. state)
Works based on periodical articles